St. Markus is located in Maxvorstadt, Munich, Bavaria, Germany.

Churches in Munich
Maxvorstadt
Cultural heritage monuments in Munich